Flowering plants are plants that bear flowers and fruits, and form the clade Angiospermae, commonly called angiosperms. The term "angiosperm" is derived from the Greek words ἀγγεῖον / ('container, vessel') and σπέρμα /  ('seed'), meaning those plants that produce their seeds enclosed within a fruit. They are by far the most diverse group of land plants with 64 orders, 416 families, approximately 13,000 known genera and 300,000 known species. Angiosperms were formerly called Magnoliophyta.

Like gymnosperms, angiosperms are seed-producing plants. They are distinguished from gymnosperms by characteristics including flowers, endosperm within their seeds, and the production of fruits that contain the seeds.

The ancestors of flowering plants diverged from the common ancestor of all living gymnosperms before the end of the Carboniferous, over 300 million years ago. The origin and closest fossil relatives of flowering plants are uncertain and contentious. The earliest angiosperm fossils are in the form of pollen around 134 million years ago during the Early Cretaceous. Over the course of the Cretaceous, angiosperms diversified explosively, becoming the dominant group of plants across the planet by the end of the period, corresponding with the decline and extinction of previously widespread gymnosperm groups.

Description

Angiosperm derived characteristics
Angiosperms differ from other seed plants in several ways, described in the table below. These distinguishing characteristics taken together have made the angiosperms the most diverse and numerous land plants, and the most commercially important group to humans.

Vascular anatomy

Angiosperm stems are made up of seven layers as shown on the right. The amount and complexity of tissue-formation in flowering plants exceeds that of gymnosperms.

In the dicotyledons, the vascular bundles of the stem are arranged such that the xylem and phloem form concentric rings. The bundles in the very young stem are arranged in an open ring, separating a central pith from an outer cortex. In each bundle, separating the xylem and phloem, is a layer of meristem or active formative tissue known as cambium. By the formation of a layer of cambium between the bundles (interfascicular cambium), a complete ring is formed, and a regular periodical increase in thickness results from the development of xylem on the inside and phloem on the outside. The soft phloem becomes crushed, but the hard wood persists and forms the bulk of the stem and branches of the woody perennial. Owing to differences in the character of the elements produced at the beginning and end of the season, the wood is marked out in transverse section into concentric rings, one for each season of growth, called annual rings.

Among the monocotyledons, the bundles are more numerous in the young stem and are scattered through the ground tissue. They contain no cambium and once formed the stem increases in diameter only in exceptional cases.

Reproductive anatomy

The characteristic feature of angiosperms is the flower. Flowers show remarkable variation in form and elaboration, and provide the most trustworthy external characteristics for establishing relationships among angiosperm species. The function of the flower is to ensure fertilization of the ovule and development of fruit containing seeds. The floral apparatus may arise terminally on a shoot or from the axil of a leaf (where the petiole attaches to the stem). Occasionally, as in violets, a flower arises singly in the axil of an ordinary foliage-leaf. More typically, the flower-bearing portion of the plant is sharply distinguished from the foliage-bearing or vegetative portion, and forms a more or less elaborate branch-system called an inflorescence.

There are two kinds of reproductive cells produced by flowers. Microspores, which will divide to become pollen grains, are the "male" cells and are borne in the stamens (or microsporophylls). The "female" cells called megaspores, which will divide to become the egg cell (megagametogenesis), are contained in the ovule and enclosed in the carpel (or megasporophyll).

The flower may consist only of these parts, as in willow, where each flower comprises only a few stamens or two carpels. Usually, other structures are present and serve to protect the sporophylls and to form an envelope attractive to pollinators. The individual members of these surrounding structures are known as sepals and petals (or tepals in flowers such as Magnolia where sepals and petals are not distinguishable from each other). The outer series (calyx of sepals) is usually green and leaf-like, and functions to protect the rest of the flower, especially the bud. The inner series (corolla of petals) is, in general, white or brightly colored, and is more delicate in structure. It functions to attract insect or bird pollinators. Attraction is effected by color, scent, and nectar, which may be secreted in some part of the flower. The characteristics that attract pollinators account for the popularity of flowers and flowering plants among humans.

While the majority of flowers are perfect or hermaphrodite (having both pollen and ovule producing parts in the same flower structure), flowering plants have developed numerous morphological and physiological mechanisms to reduce or prevent self-fertilization. Heteromorphic flowers have short carpels and long stamens, or vice versa, so animal pollinators cannot easily transfer pollen to the pistil (receptive part of the carpel). Homomorphic flowers may employ a biochemical (physiological) mechanism called self-incompatibility to discriminate between self and non-self pollen grains. Alternatively, in dioecious species, the male and female parts are morphologically separated, developing on different individual flowers.

Taxonomy

History of classification

Hermannn's Angiospermae including only flowering plants possessing seeds enclosed in capsules, distinguished from his Gymnospermae, which were flowering plants with achenial or schizo-carpic fruits, the whole fruit or each of its pieces being here regarded as a seed and naked. The terms Angiospermae and Gymnospermae were used by Carl Linnaeus with the same sense, but with restricted application, in the names of the orders of his class Didynamia.

The terms angiosperms and gymnosperm fundamentally changed in meaning in 1827 when Robert Brown established the existence of truly naked ovules in the Cycadeae and Coniferae. The term gymnosperm was from then on applied to seed plants with naked ovules, and the term angiosperm to seed plants with enclosed ovules. However, for many years after Brown's discovery, the primary division of the seed plants was seen as between monocots and dicots, with gymnosperms as a small subset of the dicots.

In 1851, Hofmeister discovered the changes occurring in the embryo-sac of flowering plants, and determined the correct relationships of these to the Cryptogamia. This fixed the position of Gymnosperms as a class distinct from Dicotyledons, and the term Angiosperm then gradually came to be accepted as the suitable designation for the whole of the flowering plants other than Gymnosperms, including the classes of Dicotyledons and Monocotyledons. This is the sense in which the term is used today.

In most taxonomies, the flowering plants are treated as a coherent group. The most popular descriptive name has been Angiospermae, with Anthophyta (lit. 'flower-plants') a second choice (both unranked). The Wettstein system and Engler system treated them as a subdivision (Angiospermae). The Reveal system also treated them as a subdivision (Magnoliophytina), but later split it to Magnoliopsida, Liliopsida, and Rosopsida. The Takhtajan system and Cronquist system treat them as a division (Magnoliophyta). The Dahlgren system and Thorne system (1992) treat them as a class (Magnoliopsida). The APG system of 1998, and the later 2003 and 2009 revisions, treat the flowering plants as an unranked clade without a formal Latin name (angiosperms). A formal classification was published alongside the 2009 revision in which the flowering plants rank as a subclass (Magnoliidae).

The internal classification of this group has undergone considerable revision. The Cronquist system, proposed by Arthur Cronquist in 1968 and published in its full form in 1981, is still widely used but is no longer believed to accurately reflect phylogeny. A consensus about how the flowering plants should be arranged has recently begun to emerge through the work of the Angiosperm Phylogeny Group (APG), which published an influential reclassification of the angiosperms in 1998. Updates incorporating more recent research were published as the APG II system in 2003, the APG III system in 2009, and the APG IV system in 2016.

Traditionally, the flowering plants are divided into two groups,
 Dicotyledoneae or Magnoliopsida
 Monocotyledoneae or Liliopsida
to which the Cronquist system ascribes the classes Magnoliopsida (from "Magnoliaceae") and Liliopsida (from "Liliaceae"). Other descriptive names allowed by Article 16 of the ICBN include Dicotyledones or Dicotyledoneae, and Monocotyledones or Monocotyledoneae, which have a long history of use. In plain English, their members may be called "dicotyledons" ("dicots") and "monocotyledons" ("monocots"). The Latin behind these names refers the observation that the dicots most often have two cotyledons, or embryonic leaves, within each seed. The monocots usually have only one, but the rule is not absolute either way. From a broad diagnostic point of view, the number of cotyledons is neither a particularly handy, nor a reliable character.

Recent studies, as by the APG, show that the monocots form a monophyletic group (a clade) but that the dicots are paraphyletic. Nevertheless, the majority of dicot species fall into a clade, the eudicots or tricolpates, and most of the remaining fall into another major clade, the magnoliids, containing about 9,000 species. The rest include a paraphyletic grouping of early branching taxa known collectively as the basal angiosperms, plus the families Ceratophyllaceae and Chloranthaceae.

Classification 

There are eight groups of living angiosperms:

 Basal angiosperms (ANA: Amborella, Nymphaeales, Austrobaileyales)
 Amborella, a single species of shrub from New Caledonia;
 Nymphaeales, about 80 species, water lilies and Hydatellaceae;
 Austrobaileyales, about 100 species of woody plants from various parts of the world
 Core angiosperms (Mesangiospermae)
 Chloranthales, 77 known species of aromatic plants with toothed leaves;
 Magnoliids, about 10,000 species, characterised by trimerous flowers, pollen with one pore, and usually branching-veined leaves—for example magnolias, bay laurel, and black pepper;
 Monocots, about 70,000 species, characterised by trimerous flowers, a single cotyledon, pollen with one pore, and usually parallel-veined leaves—for example grasses, orchids, and palms;
 Ceratophyllum, about 6 species of aquatic plants, perhaps most familiar as aquarium plants;
 Eudicots, about 175,000 species, characterised by 4- or 5-merous flowers, pollen with three pores, and usually branching-veined leaves—for example sunflowers, petunia, buttercup, apples, and oaks.

The exact relationships among these groups is not yet clear, although there is agreement that the first three to diverge from the ancestral angiosperm were Amborellales, Nymphaeales, and Austrobaileyales (basal angiosperms) The eudicots and monocots are the largest and most diversified, with ~75% and 20% of angiosperm species, respectively. Some analyses make the magnoliids the first to diverge, others the monocots. Ceratophyllum seems to group with the eudicots rather than with the monocots. The APG IV retained the overall higher order relationship described in APG III. Using the first sequencing of the Chloranthus genome, Guo 2021 has placed the Chloranthales as sister to the magnoliids.

Evolutionary history

Paleozoic
Fossilised spores suggest that land plants (embryophytes) have existed for at least 475 million years. Early land plants reproduced sexually with flagellated, swimming sperm, like the green algae from which they evolved. An adaptation to terrestrial life was the development of upright sporangia for dispersal by spores to new habitats. This feature is lacking in the descendants of their nearest algal relatives, the Charophycean green algae. A later terrestrial adaptation took place with retention of the delicate, avascular sexual stage, the gametophyte, within the tissues of the vascular sporophyte. This occurred by spore germination within sporangia rather than spore release, as in non-seed plants. A current example of how this might have happened can be seen in the precocious spore germination in Selaginella, the spike-moss. The result for the ancestors of angiosperms and gymnosperms was enclosing the female gamete in a case, the seed. 
The first seed-bearing plants were gymnosperms, like the ginkgo, and conifers (such as pines and firs). These did not produce flowers. The pollen grains (male gametophytes) of Ginkgo and cycads produce a pair of flagellated, mobile sperm cells that "swim" down the developing pollen tube to the female and her eggs.

Angiosperms appear suddenly and in great diversity in the fossil record in the Early Cretaceous. This poses such a problem for the theory of gradual evolution that Charles Darwin called it an "abominable mystery". Several groups of extinct gymnosperms, in particular seed ferns, have been proposed as the ancestors of flowering plants, but there is no continuous fossil evidence showing how flowers evolved, and botanists still regard the issue as unsolved.

Several claims of pre-Cretaceous angiosperm fossils have been made, such as the upper Triassic Sanmiguelia lewisi, but none of these are widely accepted by paleobotanists. Oleanane, a secondary metabolite produced by many flowering plants, has been found in Permian deposits of that age together with fossils of gigantopterids. Gigantopterids are a group of extinct seed plants that share many morphological traits with flowering plants, although they are not known to have been flowering plants themselves. Molecular evidence suggests that the ancestors of angiosperms diverged from the gymnosperms during the late Devonian, about 365 million years ago, despite only appearing in the fossil record during the Early Cretaceous, almost two hundred million years later.

Triassic and Jurassic

Based on fossil evidence, some have proposed that the ancestors of the angiosperms diverged from an unknown group of gymnosperms in the Triassic period (245–202 million years ago). Fossil angiosperm-like pollen from the Middle Triassic (247.2–242.0 Ma) suggests an older date for their origin, which is further supported by genetic evidence of the ancestors of angiosperms diverging during the Devonian. A close relationship between angiosperms and gnetophytes, proposed on the basis of morphological evidence, has more recently been disputed on the basis of molecular evidence that suggest gnetophytes are instead more closely related to conifers and other gymnosperms.

The fossil plant species Nanjinganthus dendrostyla from Early Jurassic China seems to share many exclusively angiosperm features, such as a thickened receptacle with ovules, and thus might represent a crown-group or a stem-group angiosperm. However, these have been disputed by other researchers, who contend that the structures are misinterpreted decomposed conifer cones.

The evolution of seed plants and later angiosperms appears to be the result of two distinct rounds of whole genome duplication events. Another possible whole genome duplication event at  perhaps created the ancestral line that led to all modern flowering plants. That event was studied by sequencing the genome of an ancient flowering plant, Amborella trichopoda.

One study has suggested that the early-middle Jurassic plant Schmeissneria, traditionally considered a type of ginkgo, may be the earliest known angiosperm, or at least a close relative. This, along with all other pre-Cretaceous angiosperm fossil claims, is strongly disputed by many paleobotanists.

Many paleobotanists consider the Caytoniales, a group of "seed ferns" that first appeared during the Triassic and went extinct in the Cretaceous, to be amongst the best candidates for a close relative of angiosperms.

Cretaceous
Whereas the earth had previously been dominated by ferns and conifers, angiosperms quickly spread during the Cretaceous. They now comprise about 90% of all plant species including most food crops. It has been proposed that the swift rise of angiosperms to dominance was facilitated by a reduction in their genome size. During the early Cretaceous period, only angiosperms underwent rapid genome downsizing, while genome sizes of ferns and gymnosperms remained unchanged. Smaller genomes—and smaller nuclei—allow for faster rates of cell division and smaller cells. Thus, species with smaller genomes can pack more, smaller cells—in particular veins and stomata—into a given leaf volume. Genome downsizing therefore facilitated higher rates of leaf gas exchange (transpiration and photosynthesis) and faster rates of growth. This would have countered some of the negative physiological effects of genome duplications, facilitated increased uptake of carbon dioxide despite concurrent declines in atmospheric CO2 concentrations, and allowed the flowering plants to outcompete other land plants.

The oldest known fossils definitively attributable to angiosperms are reticulated monosulcate pollen from the late Valanginian (Early or Lower Cretaceous - 140 to 133 million years ago) of Italy and Israel, likely representative of the basal angiosperm grade.

The earliest known macrofossil confidently identified as an angiosperm, Archaefructus liaoningensis, is dated to about 125 million years BP (the Cretaceous period), whereas pollen considered to be of angiosperm origin takes the fossil record back to about 130 million years BP, with Montsechia representing the earliest flower at that time.

In 2013 flowers encased in amber were found and dated 100 million years before present. The amber had frozen the act of sexual reproduction in the process of taking place. Microscopic images showed tubes growing out of pollen and penetrating the flower's stigma. The pollen was sticky, suggesting it was carried by insects. In August 2017, scientists presented a detailed description and 3D model image of what the first flower possibly looked like, and presented the hypothesis that it may have lived about 140 million years ago.

Recent DNA analysis based on molecular systematics showed that Amborella trichopoda, found on the Pacific island of New Caledonia, belongs to a sister group of the other flowering plants, and morphological studies suggest that it has features that may have been characteristic of the earliest flowering plants. The orders Amborellales, Nymphaeales, and Austrobaileyales diverged as separate lineages from the remaining angiosperm clade at a very early stage in flowering plant evolution.

The great angiosperm radiation, when a great diversity of angiosperms appears in the fossil record, occurred in the mid-Cretaceous (approximately 100 million years ago). However, a study in 2007 estimated that the division of the five most recent of the eight main groups occurred around 140 million years ago. (the genus Ceratophyllum, the family Chloranthaceae, the eudicots, the magnoliids, and the monocots) .

It is generally assumed that the function of flowers, from the start, was to involve mobile animals in their reproduction processes. That is, pollen can be scattered even if the flower is not brightly colored or oddly shaped in a way that attracts animals; however, by expending the energy required to create such traits, angiosperms can enlist the aid of animals and, thus, reproduce more efficiently.

Island genetics provides one proposed explanation for the sudden, fully developed appearance of flowering plants. Island genetics is believed to be a common source of speciation in general, especially when it comes to radical adaptations that seem to have required inferior transitional forms. Flowering plants may have evolved in an isolated setting like an island or island chain, where the plants bearing them were able to develop a highly specialised relationship with some specific animal (a wasp, for example). Such a relationship, with a hypothetical wasp carrying pollen from one plant to another much the way fig wasps do today, could result in the development of a high degree of specialisation in both the plant(s) and their partners. Note that the wasp example is not incidental; bees, which, it is postulated, evolved specifically due to mutualistic plant relationships, are descended from wasps.

Animals are also involved in the distribution of seeds. Fruit, which is formed by the enlargement of flower parts, is frequently a seed-dispersal tool that attracts animals to eat or otherwise disturb it, incidentally scattering the seeds it contains (see frugivory). Although many such mutualistic relationships remain too fragile to survive competition and to spread widely, flowering proved to be an unusually effective means of reproduction, spreading (whatever its origin) to become the dominant form of land plant life.

Flower ontogeny uses a combination of genes normally responsible for forming new shoots. The most primitive flowers probably had a variable number of flower parts, often separate from (but in contact with) each other. The flowers tended to grow in a spiral pattern, to be bisexual (in plants, this means both male and female parts on the same flower), and to be dominated by the ovary (female part). As flowers evolved, some variations developed parts fused together, with a much more specific number and design, and with either specific sexes per flower or plant or at least "ovary-inferior". Flower evolution continues to the present day; modern flowers have been so profoundly influenced by humans that some of them cannot be pollinated in nature. Many modern domesticated flower species were formerly simple weeds, which sprouted only when the ground was disturbed. Some of them tended to grow with human crops, perhaps already having symbiotic companion plant relationships with them, and the prettiest did not get plucked because of their beauty, developing a dependence upon and special adaptation to human affection.

A few paleontologists have also proposed that flowering plants, or angiosperms, might have evolved due to interactions with dinosaurs. One of the idea's strongest proponents is Robert T. Bakker. He proposes that herbivorous dinosaurs, with their eating habits, provided a selective pressure on plants, for which adaptations either succeeded in deterring or coping with predation by herbivores.

By the late Cretaceous, angiosperms appear to have dominated environments formerly occupied by ferns and cycadophytes, but large canopy-forming trees replaced conifers as the dominant trees only close to the end of the Cretaceous 66 million years ago or even later, at the beginning of the Paleogene. The radiation of herbaceous angiosperms occurred much later. Yet, many fossil plants recognisable as belonging to modern families (including beech, oak, maple, and magnolia) had already appeared by the late Cretaceous. Flowering plants appeared in Australia about 126 million years ago. This also pushed the age of ancient Australian vertebrates, in what was then a south polar continent, to 126–110 million years old.

Gallery

Diversity 

The number of species of flowering plants is estimated to be in the range of 250,000 to 400,000. This compares to around 12,000 species of moss and 11,000 species of pteridophytes, showing that flowering plants are much more diverse. The number of families in APG (1998) was 462. In APG II (2003) it is not settled; at maximum it is 457, but within this number there are 55 optional segregates, so that the minimum number of families in this system is 402. In APG III (2009) there are 415 families. Compared to the APG III system, the APG IV system recognizes five new orders (Boraginales, Dilleniales, Icacinales, Metteniusales and Vahliales), along with some new families, making a total of 64 angiosperm orders and 416 families.
The diversity of flowering plants is not evenly distributed. Nearly all species belong to the eudicot (75%), monocot (23%), and magnoliid (2%) clades. The remaining five clades contain a little over 250 species in total; i.e. less than 0.1% of flowering plant diversity, divided among nine families. The 43 most diverse of 443 families of flowering plants by species, in their APG circumscriptions, are:

Reproduction

Fertilisation and embryogenesis

Double fertilization requires two sperm cells to fertilise cells in the ovule. This process begins when a pollen grain adheres to the stigma of the pistil (female reproductive structure), germinates, and grows a long pollen tube. While this pollen tube is growing, a haploid generative cell travels down the tube behind the tube nucleus. The generative cell divides by mitosis to produce two haploid (n) sperm cells. As the pollen tube grows, it makes its way from the stigma, down the style and into the ovary. Here the pollen tube reaches the micropyle of the ovule and digests its way into one of the synergids, releasing its contents (which include the sperm cells). The synergid that the cells were released into degenerates and one sperm makes its way to fertilise the egg cell, producing a diploid (2n) zygote. The second sperm cell fuses with both central cell nuclei, producing a triploid (3n) cell. As the zygote develops into an embryo, the triploid cell develops into the endosperm, which serves as the embryo's food supply. The ovary will now develop into a fruit and the ovule will develop into a seed.

Fruit and seed

As the development of the embryo and endosperm proceeds within the embryo sac, the sac wall enlarges and combines with the nucellus (which is likewise enlarging) and the integument to form the seed coat. The ovary wall develops to form the fruit or pericarp, whose form is closely associated with type of seed dispersal system.

Frequently, the influence of fertilisation is felt beyond the ovary, and other parts of the flower take part in the formation of the fruit, e.g., the floral receptacle in the apple, strawberry, and others.

The character of the seed coat bears a definite relation to that of the fruit. They protect the embryo and aid in dissemination; they may also directly promote germination. Among plants with indehiscent fruits, in general, the fruit provides protection for the embryo and secures dissemination. In this case, the seed coat is only slightly developed. If the fruit is dehiscent and the seed is exposed, in general, the seed-coat is well developed and must discharge the functions otherwise executed by the fruit.

In some cases, like in the Asteraceae family, species have evolved to exhibit heterocarpy, or the production of different fruit morphs. These fruit morphs, produced from one plant, are different in size and shape, which influence dispersal range and germination rate. These fruit morphs are adapted to different environments, increasing chances for survival.

Meiosis
Like all diploid multicellular organisms that use sexual reproduction, flowering plants generate gametes using a specialised type of cell division called meiosis. Meiosis takes place in the ovule—a structure within the ovary that is located within the pistil at the centre of the flower (see diagram labeled "Angiosperm lifecycle"). A diploid cell (megaspore mother cell) in the ovule undergoes meiosis (involving two successive cell divisions) to produce four cells (megaspores) with haploid nuclei. It is thought that the basal chromosome number in angiosperms is n=7. One of these four cells (megaspore) then undergoes three successive mitotic divisions to produce an immature embryo sac (megagametophyte) with eight haploid nuclei. Next, these nuclei are segregated into separate cells by cytokinesis to produce three antipodal cells, two synergid cells and an egg cell. Two polar nuclei are left in the central cell of the embryo sac.

Pollen is also produced by meiosis in the male anther (microsporangium). During meiosis, a diploid microspore mother cell undergoes two successive meiotic divisions to produce four haploid cells (microspores or male gametes). Each of these microspores, after further mitoses, becomes a pollen grain (microgametophyte) containing two haploid generative (sperm) cells and a tube nucleus. When a pollen grain makes contact with the female stigma, the pollen grain forms a pollen tube that grows down the style into the ovary. In the act of fertilisation, a male sperm nucleus fuses with the female egg nucleus to form a diploid zygote that can then develop into an embryo within the newly forming seed. Upon germination of the seed, a new plant can grow and mature.

The adaptive function of meiosis is currently a matter of debate. A key event during meiosis in a diploid cell is the pairing of homologous chromosomes and homologous recombination (the exchange of genetic information) between homologous chromosomes. This process promotes the production of increased genetic diversity among progeny and the recombinational repair of damages in the DNA to be passed on to progeny. To explain the adaptive function of meiosis in flowering plants, some authors emphasise diversity and others emphasise DNA repair.

Apomixis

Apomixis (reproduction via asexually formed seeds) is found naturally in about 2.2% of angiosperm genera. One type of apomixis, gametophytic apomixis found in a dandelion species involves formation of an unreduced embryo sac due to incomplete meiosis (apomeiosis) and development of an embryo from the unreduced egg inside the embryo sac, without fertilisation (parthenogenesis).

Some angiosperms, including many citrus varieties, are able to produce fruits through a type of apomixis called nucellar embryony.

Uses

Agriculture is almost entirely dependent on angiosperms, which provide virtually all plant-based food, and also provide a significant amount of livestock feed. Of all the families of plants, the Poaceae, or grass family (providing grains), is by far the most important, providing the bulk of all feedstocks (rice, maize, wheat, barley, rye, oats, pearl millet, sugar cane, sorghum). The Fabaceae, or legume family, comes in second place. Also of high importance are the Solanaceae, or nightshade family (potatoes, tomatoes, and peppers, among others); the Cucurbitaceae, or gourd family (including pumpkins and melons); the Brassicaceae, or mustard plant family (including rapeseed and the innumerable varieties of the cabbage species Brassica oleracea); and the Apiaceae, or parsley family. Many of our fruits come from the Rutaceae, or rue family (including oranges, lemons, grapefruits, etc.), and the Rosaceae, or rose family (including apples, pears, cherries, apricots, plums, etc.).

In some parts of the world, certain single species assume paramount importance because of their variety of uses, for example the coconut (Cocos nucifera) on Pacific atolls, and the olive (Olea europaea) in the Mediterranean region.

Flowering plants also provide economic resources in the form of wood, paper, fiber (cotton, flax, and hemp, among others), medicines (digitalis, camphor), decorative and landscaping plants, and many other uses. Coffee and cocoa are the common beverages obtained from the flowering plants. The main area in which they are surpassed by other plants—namely, coniferous trees (Pinales), which are non-flowering (gymnosperms)—is timber and paper production.

See also 
 List of garden plants
 List of plant orders
 List of plants by common name
 List of systems of plant taxonomy

Notes

References

Bibliography

Articles, books and chapters

 
 
 
 
 
 
 1st edition published by Oxford University Press in 1991 
 
 
 Cromie, William J. (December 16, 1999). "Oldest Known Flowering Plants Identified By Genes". Harvard University Gazette.
 
 
 
 
 
 
 
 
 
 
 Raven, P.H., R.F. Evert, S.E. Eichhorn. Biology of Plants, 7th Edition. W.H. Freeman. 2004
 Sattler, R. 1973. Organogenesis of Flowers. A Photographic Text-Atlas. University of Toronto Press.

Websites

External links 
 
 
 

Angiosperms
Plant sexuality
Plants
Pollination